Leucorrhinia albifrons, the dark whiteface, is a species of dragonfly in the family Libellulidae. It is found in Austria, Belarus, the Czech Republic, Denmark, Estonia, Finland, France, Germany, Kazakhstan, Latvia, Lithuania, the Netherlands, Norway, Poland, Russia, Slovakia, Sweden, Switzerland, and Ukraine. Its natural habitats are shrub-dominated wetlands, swamps, intermittent freshwater lakes, and freshwater marshes. It is threatened by habitat loss.

References 

Libellulidae
Dragonflies of Europe
Insects described in 1839
Taxonomy articles created by Polbot